Superior Township may refer to:

 Superior Township, Dickinson County, Iowa
 Superior Township, Osage County, Kansas, in Osage County, Kansas
 Superior Township, McPherson County, Kansas
 Superior Township, Chippewa County, Michigan
 Superior Township, Washtenaw County, Michigan
 Superior Township, Eddy County, North Dakota, in Eddy County, North Dakota
 Superior Township, Williams County, Ohio

See also

Superior (disambiguation)

Township name disambiguation pages